25 April is a 2015 New Zealand animated documentary film about the 1915 Gallipoli Campaign directed by Leanne Pooley. It was screened in the Contemporary World Cinema section of the 2015 Toronto International Film Festival.

Reception 
The film received mostly positive reviews. In New Zealand, Newshub's Tony Wright gave it four-and-a-half stars and described it as "startlingly original", praising the use of animation to depict the "depravity" of war. The New Zealand Herald's Peter Calder similarly called it "evocative and moving", adding that the recreation of first-hand accounts of soldiers and a nurse "knit together to provide a comprehensive account of the doomed eight-month campaign to take the peninsula whose name resounds through our national myth."

Graeme Tuckett, of Stuff.co.nz, gave 25 April a negative review with two-and-a-half stars. He wrote that it lacked "any sort of context or overview", failed to focus on any Ottoman soldiers and was "unoriginal". He compared it unfavorably with Tolga Ornek's Gallipoli (2005).

Tom Peters and Sam Price of the World Socialist Web Site wrote that the documentary had some "moving portrayals" but criticized it for not opposing the First World War itself, instead taking a "national-isolationist" position. They also noted the film-makers' "almost exclusive focus on what the New Zealand and Australian forces endured" and failure to "convey the enormity of the Ottoman Empire's casualties."

References

External links
 
 

2015 films
2015 documentary films
New Zealand animated films
New Zealand documentary films
Documentary films about World War I
Films about the Gallipoli campaign
Animated documentary films
2010s English-language films